Armungia, Armùngia in sardinian language,   is a comune (municipality) in the Province of South Sardinia in the Italian region Sardinia, located about  northeast of Cagliari.

Armungia borders the following municipalities: Ballao, San Nicolò Gerrei, Villaputzu, Villasalto.

References

External links 

 Official website

Cities and towns in Sardinia